Parker's Woods may refer to:

Parker's Woods (Mason City, Iowa)
Parkers Woods and Buttercup Valley Nature Preserve, Cincinnati, Ohio